The third edition of the Pan Pacific Swimming Championships, a long course (50 m) event, was held in 1989 in Tokyo, Japan at the Yoyogi National Olympic Pool from August 17–20.

Results

Men's events

Women's events

References
Results on GBRSports.com
Results on USA Swimming 

P
Pan Pacific Swimming Championships
Pan Pacific Swimming Championships
International aquatics competitions hosted by Japan
Swimming competitions in Japan